These are all the international matches played by Pakistan national field hockey team from 1948 to 1959.

Results

1948 
1948 Summer Olympics

Test series

1950 
Barcelona International Hockey Festival

1952 
1952 Summer Olympics

1954 
Test series

1955 

Test series

1956 
1956 Summer Olympics

Test series

1958 
1958 Asian Games

Test series

Records and statistics

Head-to-head record

Competitive record 

Field hockey in Pakistan
1940s in Pakistani sport
1950s in Pakistani sport